Lasus of Hermione was a Greek lyric poet of the 6th century BC from the city of Hermione in the Argolid.  He is known to have been active at Athens under the reign of the Peisistratids. Pseudo-Plutarch's De Musica credits him with innovations in the dithyramb hymn. According to Herodotus, Lasus also exposed Onomacritus's forgeries of the oracles of Musaeus. Lasus is recorded to have written a now lost treatise on music, of which very little is known.

References

Sources
 
 

Ancient Argolis
Ancient Greek lyric poets
6th-century BC Greek people
6th-century BC poets
Immigrants to Archaic Athens
Ancient Greek musicians
Dithyrambic poets
Year of birth unknown
Year of death unknown